Danny Sanchez is an American soccer coach and retired player who is the head coach of the University of Colorado women's soccer team.

Player
Sanchez played for Arcadia Scottsdale United Soccer Club (ASUSC) growing up.  He graduated from Coronado High School in Scottsdale, Arizona where he played soccer, football and baseball.

In 1987 and 1988, Sanchez played soccer at Mesa Community College.  He is seventh on the school's career goals list.  In the summer of 1989, Sanchez played for the Arizona Condors in the Western Soccer League.  In 1989, Sanchez transferred to the University of Connecticut where he completed his final two years of collegiate eligibility.  In 1991, he graduated with a bachelor's degree in economics.  Sanchez then returned to Arizona where he played for the Arizona Cotton in the USISL.

Coach
In 1995, Mesa Community College hired Sanchez to coach both its men's and women soccer teams.  From 1995 to 2001, he compiled a 103–15–5 record with the women's team and a  96–36–7 record with the men's team.  He was also the 1995 and 2001 Arizona Community College Athletic Conference Coach of the Year.  In February 2002, Metropolitan State University hired Sanchez to coach its women's soccer team.  Over six seasons, Sanchez took the Roadrunners to a 128–11–7 record and the 2004 and 2006 NCAA Division II Women's Soccer Championship.  At the same time as he was coaching Metro State, Sanchez also served as the head coach of the Mile High Edge in the W-League.  In December 2007, Sanchez moved to the University of Wyoming.  Sanchez did not experience as much success with the Cowgirls as with his two previous collegiate teams.  Over four seasons, he took them to a 36–34–11 record.  On December 19, 2011, Sanchez became the head coach of the University of Colorado women's team.

References

External links
 Colorado Buffalos: Danny Sanchez

Living people
American soccer coaches
American soccer players
Arizona Condors players
Arizona Sahuaros players
UConn Huskies men's soccer players
Mesa Community College alumni
USISL players
USL W-League (1995–2015) coaches
Western Soccer Alliance players
1969 births
Colorado Buffaloes women's soccer coaches
Wyoming Cowgirls soccer coaches
Soccer players from Scottsdale, Arizona
Association football forwards
Metro State Roadrunners women's soccer coaches